Tserenjavyn Enkhjargal (born 26 October 1984) is a Mongolian international footballer. He made his first appearance for the Mongolia national football team in 2000.

References

1984 births
Mongolian footballers
Mongolia international footballers
Erchim players
Living people
Association football defenders
Mongolian National Premier League players